Pameacha Creek is a stream in Middletown, Connecticut.

See also
List of rivers of Connecticut

References

Rivers of Middlesex County, Connecticut
Middletown, Connecticut
Tributaries of the Connecticut River
Rivers of Connecticut